Pete the Cat is a fictional cartoon cat, created by American artist James Dean. The series started with four books illustrated by Dean and with text by Eric Litwin; since then, James Dean and his wife Kimberly Dean have written and illustrated the series of books.

Content

The first book, Pete the Cat: I Love My White Shoes, is the story of a cat named Pete whose white shoes become dirty after he steps in various substances, but "Pete never loses his cool." Written as a song, its refrain is "I love my white shoes", changing to "I love my red shoes", "I love my blue shoes", and "I love my brown shoes". Then he steps in a bucket of water and the colors wash off, and they become wet, but still never loses his cool, he just sings his song.

The book was self-published in 2008 and sold 7,000 copies in 10 months before it was picked up by HarperCollins – alerted by a YouTube meme in which two little girls read the book – and distributed throughout the United States and Canada. It rose to number 8 on the New York Times Best Seller list for picture books.

Author and illustrator

Eric Litwin (also known as "Mr. Eric") is an American storyteller and musician from Atlanta, Georgia.

The book uses a character first devised by James Dean, an artist active in Atlanta, who drew up Pete in 1999 and in 2006 self-published The Misadventures of Pete the Cat. Litwin wrote a story about and a song for the cat, and the two began a partnership.

The collaboration between Dean and Litwin ended in 2011. James Dean and wife Kimberly Dean continue to write and illustrate the Pete the Cat series, now over 60 books, together.

Honors

In 2010, the Georgia Center for the Book released a list titled, "25 Books All Young Georgians Should Read". Pete the Cat: I Love My White Shoes is one of the books included in that list.

Adaptations
On December 26, 2017, an animated holiday special, Pete the Cat: A Groovy New Year, was released on Amazon Prime. Jacob Tremblay starred as the title character, with his parents voiced by Elvis Costello and Diana Krall. Additional voices were provided by Atticus Shaffer, KT Tunstall, and Don Was. It was followed by a Pete the Cat series, based on the books and developed by Phineas and Ferb co-creator Jeff "Swampy" Marsh, which was released on September 21, 2018. The series also has a Christmas special called Pete the Cat: A Very Groovy Christmas which was released on November 20, 2018, guest starring Dave Matthews and Jason Mraz. There are tie-in books based on the TV series. A second season began production as of February 2019. Throughout June–July 2019, clips from then-unreleased episodes from season 1 were uploaded to the Pete the Cat YouTube channel. The clips were later taken down in July 2019, but were reuploaded one month later. The second half of season 1 was released on August 9, 2019. A Valentine's Day special called Pete the Cat: A Very Groovy Valentine's Day was released on February 7, 2020. The first part of season 2 premiered on June 26, 2020. For season 2; Jeff "Swampy" Marsh and KT Turnstall replaced Elvis Costello and Diana Krall as Pete's parents. Three days later, the series also released a PSA about hand washing. The second part of season 2 was released on November 13, 2020. A back to school special Pete the Cat: Back to School Operetta was released on August 27, 2021. The third part of season 2 was released on November 5, 2021. The fourth and final part of season 2 was released on March 11, 2022.

TheatreWorksUSA has created two Pete the Cat'' musicals.

See also

List of fictional cats and other felines

References

External links
 

2008 children's books
American picture books
HarperCollins books
Cats in art
Books about cats
Self-published books
Animated television series by Amazon Studios